The North Aral Sea is the portion of the former Aral Sea that is fed by the Syr Darya River. It split from the South Aral Sea in 1987–1988 as water levels dropped due to river diversion for agriculture.

In 1925 a large site containing numerous fossils of the Oligocene was discovered near the village of Akespe by the northern shore of the Aral Sea.

Background

The Aral Sea began shrinking in the 1960s, when the Soviet Union decided that the two rivers feeding it, the Amu Darya and the Syr Darya, would be diverted to irrigate cotton and food crops in Kazakhstan and Uzbekistan. In 1987–1988, due to an accelerated loss of water, the Aral Sea split into northern and southern parts; the southern part is the current South Aral Sea. 

After the fall of the Soviet Union, the government of independent Kazakhstan decided to restore the northern lake fed by Syr Darya.

The poorly built Dike Kokaral intended to contain the North Aral Sea and save its fisheries failed twice, but in 2005, the government of Kazakhstan was able to fund a more robust design. Since then, water levels have risen faster than expected and fish stocks have increased. Plans to build a second dike to increase water levels further were due to begin in 2010, but have so far not materialized.
There is now an ongoing effort in Kazakhstan to save and replenish the North Aral Sea. Salinity has dropped, and fish are again found in sufficient numbers for some fishing to be viable, especially mackerel introduced at the Syr Darya river delta, though attempts to introduce tuna in 2009 failed.

See also
Barsuki Desert
Water scarcity

References

External links

FIELD TRIP TO THE ARAL SEA September 2007
Deserts of the North Aral Sea.

Lakes of Kazakhstan
Aral Sea
Ramsar sites in Kazakhstan